Salvatore Epicoco (born 1897, date of death unknown) was an Italian weightlifter. He competed in the men's heavyweight event at the 1924 Summer Olympics.

References

External links
 

1897 births
Year of death missing
Italian male weightlifters
Olympic weightlifters of Italy
Weightlifters at the 1924 Summer Olympics
Sportspeople from Lecce